Iritty taluk is one of five taluks in Kannur district of Kerala, India. Iritty was established as a taluk in March 2013 when UDF government declared new 12 taluks for the state. Iritty taluk borders with Taliparamba taluk in the north, Thalassery taluk in the west and Karnataka state towards the east. It comprises Iritty municipality, parts of Mattannur municipality and 11 surrounding panchayats.

History
Iritty taluk was established on 9th February 2014 by bifurcating Thalassery and Taliparamba taluks. Kerala ex Chief Minister Umman Chandy inaugurated Iritty taluk in 2014. Iritty was formed as a taluk along with other taluks in Kerala which was declared by UDF government.

Constituent villages
Iritty taluk comprises 20 villages.

 Aralam, Ayyankunnu, Chavassery, Kalliad
 Kanichar, Keezhur, Kelakam, Kolari, Karikkottakary,
 Kottiyoor, Manathana, Muzhakkunnu, Nuchiyad
 Padiyoor, Payam, Pazhassi, Thillenkeri
 Vayathur, Vellarvelly and Vilamana,

References

Geography of Kannur district
Taluks of Kerala